Shore Acres is a neighborhood of Staten Island, one of the five boroughs of New York City.  It is situated along the Upper New York Bay, just north of Fort Wadsworth and south of Rosebank. Shore Acres is generally considered to be bounded by Bay Street on the west, the Upper New York Bay on the east, Nautilus Street on the north, and Arthur Von Briesen Park on the south.

History

The name originally referred to an enclave of upscale homes which were built in the vicinity in the 1930s by Cornelius G. Kolff, a prominent real estate developer and one-time President of the Staten Island Chamber of Commerce.  Soon after the homes were built, the name "Shore Acres" began to be applied to the locality itself.

Features
Shore Acres is distinctive for its secluded atmosphere, in large part provided by abundant shade trees.  Along with Randall Manor, it is one of the few upper-class neighborhoods on Staten Island not situated in the series of highlands that begin with Ward Hill in the north and stretch to Lighthouse Hill in the south.

Transportation

References

Neighborhoods in Staten Island